Sweet v Parsley was an English criminal law case where the defendant landlady of a farmhouse (which was let to students and which she visited infrequently) was charged under a 1965 Act "of having been concerned in the management of premises used for smoking cannabis".

This conviction was later quashed by the House of Lords on the grounds that knowledge of the use of the premises was essential to the offence. Since she had no such knowledge, she did not commit the offence.

Requirement of mens rea
Lord Reid  declared:
. . . there has for centuries been a presumption that Parliament did not intend to make criminals of persons who were in no way blameworthy in what they did. That means that whenever a section is silent as to mens rea there is a presumption that, in order to give effect to the will of Parliament, we must read in words appropriate to require mens rea. . . . it is firmly established by a host of authorities that mens rea is an essential ingredient of every offence unless some reason can be found for holding that that is not necessary.

The case's significance in English criminal law is that it sets out new set guidelines for determining whether an offence is one of strict liability or whether mens rea is a presumed requirement.

Lord Reid laid down the following guidelines for all cases where the offence is criminal as opposed to quasi-criminal:
Wherever a section is silent as to mens rea there is a presumption that, in order to give effect to the will of Parliament, words importing mens rea must be read into the provision.
It is a universal principle that if a penal provision is reasonably capable of two interpretations, that interpretation which is most favourable to the accused must be adopted.
The fact that other sections of the Act expressly require mens rea is not in itself sufficient to justify a decision that a section which is silent as to mens rea creates an absolute offence. It is necessary to go outside the Act and examine all relevant circumstances in order to establish that this must have been the intention of Parliament.

References

See also 
 Fault (legal)
 Strict liability (criminal)

1969 in case law
English criminal case law
1969 in British law
House of Lords cases
Cannabis law
Cannabis in the United Kingdom
1969 in cannabis